The Men's Giant Slalom competition at the 2013 World Championships ran on Friday, February 15 at 10:00 local time (1st run) and 13:30 (2nd run), the ninth race of the championships. 99 athletes from 55 countries competed in the main race while 132 athletes from 53 countries competed in the qualification race on Thursday, February 14.

Ted Ligety won his third gold medal of the 2013 World Championships, joined on the podium by Marcel Hirscher and Manfred Mölgg. Ligety became the fifth man in history to win three or more gold medals at one world championships and the first in 45 years, when Jean-Claude Killy won four in 1968. Ligety is the first racer of either gender to win the Super G, the giant slalom, and the combined at one world championships.

Results

Race 
The first run was held at 10:00 and the second run at 13:30.

Qualification 
Qualified for the actual race were the top 25 runners + one runner each from the best 25 non-represented nations amongst the qualifiers.
The first run started at 10:00 and the second run at 13:30.

References

External links
  
 FIS-Ski.com – AWSC 2013 – calendar & results

Giant slalom, men's